Tyro Tavern, also known as Thompson House and Davis House, is a historic home located at Tyro, Davidson County, North Carolina. It was built about 1840, and is a two-story, five bay by three bay, Greek Revival style brick dwelling.  It has a one-story, shed roofed rear porch.

It was added to the National Register of Historic Places in 1984.

References

Houses on the National Register of Historic Places in North Carolina
Greek Revival houses in North Carolina
Houses completed in 1840
Houses in Davidson County, North Carolina
National Register of Historic Places in Davidson County, North Carolina